William Briggs may refer to:

William Briggs (physician) (1642–1704), English physician and oculist
William Edward Briggs (1847–1903), English cotton manufacturer and Liberal politician
Sir William Edward Briggs Priestley (1859–1932), Liberal politician
William B. Briggs (born 1954), subject matter expert in sports and entertainment law
William Briggs (publisher) (1836–1922), Irish-born Canadian Methodist minister and publisher
William Perry Briggs (1856–1928), English medical officer of health
Harold Briggs (politician) (William James Harold Briggs, 1870–1945), British Conservative Party politician
Ronnie Briggs (William Ronald Briggs, 1943–2008), Northern Irish footballer
Billy Briggs (born 1977), musician and songwriter
William Briggs, a Canadian book publishing imprint later known as Ryerson Press

See also
Bill Briggs (disambiguation)
William Briggs Homestead, historic farmhouse, Auburn, Maine